Great Swamp may refer to several places:

United States 
 Great Baehre Swamp, New York
 Great Black Swamp, Ohio
 Great Cypress Swamp, Delaware and Maryland
 Great Dismal Swamp, Virginia and North Carolina
 Great Swamp (New York), New York
 Great Swamp Fight, southern Rhode Island
 Great Swamp Brook, New Jersey
 Great Swamp National Wildlife Refuge, New Jersey
 Great Swamp, a former wetland in Massachusetts, part of which is now the Alewife Brook Reservation

New Zealand 
 Great Moss Swamp